The Southwestern Range and Sheep Breeding Laboratory Historic District is a historic district in Cibola National Forest near Fort Wingate, New Mexico which was listed on the National Register of Historic Places in 2003.

It includes Pueblo Revival architecture.
Wingate on Forest Road 546.

The focus of the district is a building complex that makes up the Cibola National Forest's Fort Wingate Work Center, which originally was established as the Southwestern Range and Sheep Breeding Laboratory in 1935 by the Bureau of Indian Affairs and the U.S. Department of Agriculture.

It includes buildings designed by the architectural firm of Mayers, Murray, and Phillip.

References

National Register of Historic Places in McKinley County, New Mexico
Historic districts on the National Register of Historic Places in New Mexico
Traditional Native American dwellings
Pueblo Revival architecture in New Mexico